Pinhais is a municipality in Paraná state in Brazil. As of 2020, the population was 133,490. It was emancipated from the municipality of Piraquara in 1992 and is part of the metropolitan region of Curitiba. It is the smallest municipality in Paraná by area. In its territory lies the Autódromo Internacional de Curitiba and the Expotrade Arena.

Education 

Private schools:
 Colégio Suíço-Brasileiro de Curitiba

References

External links

Pinhais official website

Municipalities in Paraná
Populated places established in 1992
1992 establishments in Brazil